Moškanjci is a settlement in the Municipality of Gorišnica in northeastern Slovenia. The area traditionally belonged to the Styria region. It is now included in the Drava Statistical Region.

There is a small chapel-shrine in the settlement. It was built in the 1880s.

The railway line from Ptuj to Ormož runs through the settlement.

Ptuj Airport (ICAO code LJPT) is just to the north of the main settlement in the territory of Moškanjci.

References

External links
Moškanjci on Geopedia

Populated places in the Municipality of Gorišnica